The Little River is a short river in Waldo County, Maine.

See also
List of rivers of Maine

References

Maine Streamflow Data from the USGS
Maine Watershed Data From Environmental Protection Agency

Penobscot Bay
Rivers of Waldo County, Maine
Belfast, Maine
Rivers of Maine